Darrell Fenwick Smith (February 13, 1927 – June 5, 2013) was an American politician who served as the Attorney General of Arizona from 1965 to 1968.

On 26 January 1967 Smith spoke to the Arizona House of Representatives to explain why legislation was necessary to combat consumer fraud, and endorsed the Arizona Consumer Fraud Act. The legislation was passed as an emergency measure, and signed into law by Governor Jack Williams  weeks later.

He died on June 5, 2013, at age 86.

References

1927 births
2013 deaths
Arizona Attorneys General
Arizona Republicans